Çataksu can refer to:

 Çataksu, Çayırlı
 Çataksu, Olur
 Çataksu, Sur